Jesús Bonilla (born 1 September 1955) is a Spanish actor. He has appeared in more than sixty films since 1978.

Selected filmography

References

External links 

1955 births
Living people
Spanish male film actors
20th-century Spanish male actors
21st-century Spanish male actors